Tsai Hsun-hsiung (born 23 June 1941) is a Taiwanese politician. He served as Minister of the Environmental Protection Administration from 1996 to 2000. Tsai was named the Governor of Taiwan Province in 2008 before being named the Minister of Council for Economic Planning and Development in 2009. He stepped down from the CEPD in 2010.

Education
Tsai obtained his doctoral degree in urban planning from Princeton University in the United States.

References

1941 births
Living people
Chairpersons of the Taiwan Provincial Government
Taiwanese Ministers of Environment
Massachusetts Institute of Technology alumni
Princeton University alumni
National Taiwan University alumni